Manaiviye Manithanin Manickam is a 1959 Indian Tamil-language drama film directed by K. Vembu. The film stars K. Balaji, Pandari Bai and Vijayakumari. It was released on 31 July 1959.

Plot 

Lakshmi is a young woman living happily with her husband and child. Her life runs into adversity when her husband becomes involved in an affair with another woman. He neglects Lakshmi and the child and also spends the family wealth. Husband's father who was living with them, leaves the house unable to bear his sons follies. Lakshmi tolerates her husband but she is kidnapped by another person. Then the husband realises irrational behaviour and fights with the person who kidnapped his wife. He finally realises that wife is the ruby of a man.

Cast 

Male cast
K. Balaji
K. A. Thangavelu
V. Nagayya
M. R. Santhanam

Female cast
Pandari Bai
Vijayakumari
M. Saroja

Supporting cast
Thai Nagesh

Production 
Nagesh featured in a minor role and he was credited in the titles as Thai Nagesh. This is one of the few films in which the later day producer K. Balaji featured in the lead role.

Soundtrack 
Music was composed by S. Hanumantha Rao, while the lyrics were penned by Kannadasan, S. D. S. Yogi, Kovai Rajagopal, A. Maruthakasi, Puratchidasan, Salem Ramasami Pavalar, Adhimoolam, Era. Pazhanichami and V. A. Gopalakrishnan. The following list of songs is adapted from a book authored by G. Neelamegam.

Reception 
Kanthan of Kalki said the film was a headache. The film did not do well at the box office.

References

External links 

1950s Tamil-language films
1959 drama films
Films about adultery in India
Indian drama films